Canale Reale is an Italian river in the province of Brindisi. The source of the river is near Francavilla Fontana. The river flows east for a distance before curving northeast near Latiano. It enters the Adriatic Sea near the Strait of Otranto between Villanova and Brindisi.

References

Rivers of the Province of Brindisi
Rivers of Italy
Adriatic Italian coast basins